Daniel Bever Crane (January 10, 1936 – May 28, 2019) was an American dentist and a member of the U.S. House of Representatives. A Republican, he served three terms, 1979 to 1985. In 1983, he was censured by the House for having sex with a 17-year-old page.

Life and career
Crane, a native of Cook County, Illinois, attended Chicago public schools. He received his B.A. from Hillsdale College in 1958 and D.D.S. from Indiana University in 1963. After completing graduate work at the University of Michigan in 1964–1965, Crane joined the United States Army in 1965, serving until 1970. He set up a dental practice in Danville, Illinois after completing his service.

He was elected to the U.S. House of Representatives as a Republican in 1978.  He was re-elected in 1980 and in 1982.

On July 14, 1983, the House Ethics Committee recommended that Crane and Rep. Gerry Studds (D-MA) be reprimanded for having engaged in sexual relationships with teenagers, specifically a 17-year-old male page for Studds and a 17-year-old female page for Crane. Both men acknowledged the accuracy of the charges. Crane had sexual relations  with the girl in 1980. The full House voted to censure the two men. Crane was defeated for re-election in 1984 and returned to dentistry.

He was the brother of Philip Crane, also a former Republican congressman from Illinois. Both men maintained conservative voting records in Congress.

Personal life 
Crane's wife Judy (née Miller) died in 2012.  They had six children. Daniel Crane died on May 28, 2019, at the age of 83.

See also 
 List of federal political sex scandals in the United States
 List of United States representatives expelled, censured, or reprimanded

References

External links

 

|-

1936 births
2019 deaths
20th-century American politicians
20th-century dentists
American dentists
Censured or reprimanded members of the United States House of Representatives
Hillsdale College alumni
Indiana University Bloomington alumni
Military personnel from Illinois
People from Danville, Illinois
Politicians from Chicago
Republican Party members of the United States House of Representatives from Illinois
United States Army officers
University of Michigan alumni